Callisthenia costilobata is a moth of the subfamily Arctiinae. It is found in Peru.

References

Lithosiini
Moths described in 1913